Dave Milton (1888–1979) was an American art director. He spent his career at Monogram Pictures where he was a prolific contributor to the studio's films, working on more than three hundred. He is sometimes credited as David Milton.

Selected filmography
 French Leave (1948)
 Fighting Fools (1949)
 Texas Lawmen (1951)
 Whistling Hills (1951)
 Yellow Fin (1951)
 Oklahoma Justice (1951)
 Fargo (1952)
 Kansas Territory (1952)
 Montana Incident (1952)
 The Women of Pitcairn Island (1956)

References

Bibliography
 Pitts, Michael R. Western Film Series of the Sound Era. McFarland, 2009.

External links

1888 births
1979 deaths
American art directors